Afrocyclops gibsoni is a species of copepod in the family Cyclopidae. Three subspecies have been identified:
Afrocyclops gibsoni abbreviatus Kiefer, 1933
Afrocyclops gibsoni doryphorus (Kiefer, 1935)
Afrocyclops gibsoni ondoensis (Kiefer, 1952)

References

Cyclopidae
Crustaceans described in 1904